The Nuremberg International Toy Fair (German: Spielwarenmesse), held annually since 1949, is the largest international trade fair for toys and games. Only trade visitors associated with the toy business, journalists and invited guests are admitted. Each year during the course of the event which is held for six days, about 2,800 exhibitors from about 60 countries present their products.
In 2017, 73,000 trade visitors and purchasers from 123 countries came for the fair.
The fair is organized by Spielwarenmesse eG, a marketing and trade fair service provider, based in Nuremberg, Germany.

Range of products 
Every year, about one million products are displayed on the fair, including approximately 70,000 new products. On the fair, they are presented in twelve different product groups. These are, as of the 2011 fair:

	Model Construction, Hobbies
	Model Railways and Accessories
	Technical Toys, Educational toys, Action Toys
	Dolls, Soft Toys,
	Games, Books, Learning and Experimenting, Multimedia
	Festive and Trend Articles, Carnival
	Wooden Toys, Craftworks, Gifts
	Arts& Crafts, Creative Design
	Sports, Leisure, Outdoor
	School Articles, Stationery
	Baby & Infant Articles
	Multi-product Group

ToyInnovation/ToyAward 
The awarded products stand out due to their degree of innovation, product concept, creativity and playing idea.
A jury of industry experts determines the winners in five categories (as of Spielwarenmesse International Toy Fair 2011):

	Baby&Infant
	PreSchool
	SchoolKids
	Teenager&Family
	SpecialAward (Topic changing annually)

Global Toy Conference 

The Global Toy Conference takes place on the last day of the fair and deals with issues concerning the future of the toy trade and industry, e.g. sustainability, toy safety, online marketing and successful selling on the Internet.

References

External links

Official site of Spielwarenmesse International Toy Fair
Official site of Spielwarenmesse eG
Nuremberg International Toy Fair 2006 A personal visit to the toy fair with photographs
Nitro Modelismo - (Portuguese) Feira Internacional de brinquedos em Nurember

Nuremberg
Trade fairs in Germany
Recurring events established in 1950
1950 establishments in West Germany